Ellan is a village located on Singö in the north of Stockholm County.

Public Transport

SL's bus line 637 goes a few times daily from Ellan to Norrtälje. Ellan is in fact SL's northernmost stop.

Populated places in Norrtälje Municipality